Jade Mirror of the Four Unknowns, Siyuan yujian, also referred to as Jade Mirror of the Four Origins, is a 1303 mathematical monograph by Yuan dynasty mathematician Zhu Shijie. Zhu advanced Chinese algebra with this Magnum opus.

The book consists of an introduction and three books, with a total of 288 problems. The first four  problems in the introduction illustrate his method of the four unknowns. He showed how to convert a problem stated verbally into a system of polynomial equations (up to the 14th order), by using up to four unknowns: 天 Heaven, 地 Earth, 人 Man, 物 Matter, and then how to reduce the system to a single polynomial equation in one unknown by successive elimination of unknowns. He then solved the high-order equation  by Southern Song dynasty mathematician Qin Jiushao's "Ling long kai fang" method published in Shùshū Jiǔzhāng (“Mathematical Treatise in Nine Sections”) in 1247 (more than 570 years before English mathematician William Horner's method using synthetic division). To do this, he makes use of the Pascal triangle, which he labels as the diagram of an ancient method first discovered by Jia Xian before 1050.

Zhu also solved square and cube roots problems by solving quadratic and cubic equations, and added to the understanding of series and progressions, classifying them according to the coefficients of the Pascal triangle. He also showed how to solve systems of linear equations by reducing the matrix of their coefficients to diagonal form. His methods predate Blaise Pascal, William Horner, and modern matrix methods by many centuries. The preface of the book describes how Zhu travelled around China for 20 years as a teacher of mathematics.

Jade Mirror of the Four Unknowns consists of four books, with 24 classes and 288 problems, in which 232 problems deal with Tian yuan shu, 36 problems deal with variable of two variables, 13 problems of three variables, and 7 problems of four variables.

Introduction

The four quantities are x, y, z, w  can be presented with the following diagram

x
y 太w
z

The square of which is:

The Unitary Nebuls 
This section deals with Tian yuan shu or problems of one unknown.

Question: Given the product of huangfan and zhi ji equals to 24 paces, and the sum of vertical and hypothenuse equals to 9 paces, what is the value of the base?
Answer: 3 paces
Set up  unitary tian as the base( that is let the base be the unknown quantity x)

Since the product of huangfang and zhi ji = 24

in which 
huangfan is defined as：
zhi ji：

therefore  
Further, the sum of vertical and hypothenuse is

 
Set up the unknown unitary tian as the vertical

We obtain the following equation

     （）
 太

Solve it and obtain  x=3

The Mystery of Two Natures 
太 Unitary
 

equation:  ;

from the given

太
 

equation:  ;

we get:

太  
     

and

太
 

by method of elimination, we obtain a quadratic equation

 

solution:  .

The Evolution of Three Talents 
Template for solution of problem of three unknowns

Zhu Shijie explained the method of elimination in detail. His example has been quoted frequently in scientific literature.<ref>Wu Wenjun Mechanization of Mathematics (吴文俊 数学机械化 《朱世杰的一个例子》) pp. 18-19 Science Press </ref>J. Hoe  Les Systèmes d'Equations Polynômes dans le Siyuan Yujian (1303), Paris: Institut des Hautes Etudes Chinoises, 1977

Set up three equations as follows

太  

 .... I

.....II

太 

....III
Elimination of unknown between II and  III

by manipulation of exchange of variables

We obtain

      太
  

 ...IV
and

太
  

 .... V

Elimination of unknown between  IV and V we obtain a 3rd order equation

    

Solve to this 3rd order equation to obtain  ;

Change back the variables

We obtain the hypothenus =5 paces

Simultaneous of the Four Elements 
This section deals with simultaneous equations of four unknowns.

Successive elimination of unknowns to get

   

Solve this and obtain 14 paces

Book I

Problems of Right Angle Triangles and Rectangles
There are 18 problems in this section.

Problem 18

Obtain a tenth order  polynomial equation:

 

The root of which is x = 3,  multiply by 4, getting 12. That is the final answer.

Problems of Plane Figures
There are 18 problems in this section

Problems of Piece Goods
There are 9 problems in this section

Problems on Grain Storage
There are 6 problems in this section

Problems on Labour
There are 7 problems in this section

Problems of Equations for Fractional Roots
There are 13 problems in this section

Book II

Mixed Problems

Containment of Circles and Squares

Problems on Areas

Surveying with Right Angle Triangles
There are eight problems in this section
Problem 1

Let tian yuan unitary as half of the length, we obtain a 4th order equation

solve it and obtain =240 paces, hence length =2x= 480 paces=1 li and 120paces.

Similarity, let tian yuan unitary(x) equals to half of width

we get the equation:

Solve it to obtain =180 paces, length =360 paces =one li.

Problem 7 Identical to The depth of a ravine (using hence-forward cross-bars) in Haidao Suanjing.

Problem 8 Identical to The depth of a transparent pool''  in Haidao Suanjing.

Hay Stacks

Bundles of Arrows

Land Measurement

Summon Men According to Need
Problem No 5 is the earliest 4th order interpolation formula in the world

men summoned :

In which
 =1st order difference
 =2nd order difference
 =3rd order difference
 =4th order difference

Book III

Fruit pile
This section contains 20 problems dealing with triangular piles, rectangular piles

Problem 1

Find the sum of triangular pile

and value of the fruit pile is:

Zhu Shijie use Tian yuan shu to solve this problem by letting x=n

and obtained the formular

From given condition , hence

Solve it to obtain .

Therefore,

。

Figures within Figure

Simultaneous Equations

Equation of two unknowns

Left and Right

Equation of Three Unknowns

Equation of Four Unknowns
Six problems of four unknowns.

Question 2

Yield a set of equations in four unknowns: .

References

Sources

 Jade Mirror of the Four Unknowns, tr. into English by Professor Chen Zhaixin, Former Head of Mathematics Department, Yenching University (in 1925),Translated into modern Chinese by Guo Shuchun, Volume I & II, Library of Chinese Classics, Chinese-English, Liaoning Education Press 2006  https://www.scribd.com/document/357204551/Siyuan-yujian-2, https://www.scribd.com/document/357204728/Siyuan-yujian-1
Collected Works in the History of Sciences by Li Yan and Qian Baocong, Volume 1 《李俨钱宝琮科学史全集》 第一卷 钱宝琮 《中国算学史 上编》  
Zhu Shijie Siyuan yujian  Book 1–4, Annotated by Qin Dyasty mathematician Luo Shilin, Commercial Press
J. Hoe, Les systèmes d'équations polynômes dans le Siyuan yujian (1303), Institut des Hautes Études Chinoises, Paris, 1977
J. Hoe, A study of the fourteenth-century manual on polynomial equations "The jade mirror of the four unknowns" by Zhu Shijie, Mingming Bookroom, P.O. Box 29-316, Christchurch, New Zealand, 2007

Chinese mathematics
1303 books
Mathematics books